The 2017 Bulgarian Basketball Cup was the 63rd edition of the annual cup tournament in Bulgaria.It is managed by the Bulgarian Basketball Federation and was held in Plovdiv, in the Kolodruma Hall on February 16–19, 2017. Beroe won their 1st cup. Travis Daniels was named Tournament MVP and Aaron Jones was named Final MVP.

Qualified teams
The first eight teams qualified after the first stage of the 2016-17 NBL regular season .

Bracket

References

Bulgarian Basketball Cup
Cup